Lesa Cline-Ransome (née Cline), is an American author of picture books and middle grade novels, best known for her NAACP Image Award-nominated picture book biography of Harriet Tubman, Before She Was Harriet and her middle grade novel Finding Langston.

Personal life 
Cline-Ransome grew up in Malden, Massachusetts. Both her parents are nurses and she is the youngest of three siblings.

She decided she wanted to become a writer during middle school and completed a summer workshop for teens with an interest in journalism at Suffolk University. She ultimately decided that journalism wasn't for her and stopped wanting to become a writer until she received encouragement from her professors while studying at Pratt Institute. There, she worked for the college paper and took on a job in advertising.

She didn't pick up her interest in writing until she married her husband, James E. Ransome, who encouraged her to write books for children while he was working on illustrating his own first novel. She researched for nearly a year after the birth of her first child before an editor at Simon & Schuster took a chance on what would later become her third published picture book, Satchel Paige.

She lives with her husband and four children in Rhinebeck, New York.

Works 
Middle grade

 Finding Langston (Holiday House, 2018)
 Leaving Lymon (Holiday House, 2020)
 Being Clem (Holiday House, 2021)

Picture books

 Bug Club Pro Guided Year 6 The Road to Freedom (Bug Club Guided) (Pearson Education Limited, 2017)
 Bug Club Comprehension Y6 The Road to Freedom 12-pack (Bug Club Guided) (Pearson Education Limited, 2017)
 illustrated by James E. Ransome
 Quilt Alphabet (Holiday House, 2002)
 Quilt Counting (Chronicle Books, 2002)
 Satchel Paige (Aladdin, 2003)
 Major Taylor, Champion Cyclist (Atheneum, 2003)
 Young Pele: Soccer's First Star (Schwartz & Wade, 2007)
 Helen Keller: The World in Her Heart (Collins Publishers, 2008)
 Before There Was Mozart: The Story of Joseph Boulogne, Chevalier de Saint-George (Schwartz & Wade, 2011)
 Words Set Me Free: The Story of Young Frederick Douglass (Simon & Schuster, 2012)
 Light in the Darkness: A Story about How Slaves Learned in Secret (Jump at the Sun, 2013)
 Benny Goodman & Teddy Wilson: Taking the Stage as the First Black-And-White Jazz Band in History (Holiday House, 2014)
 My Story, My Dance: Robert Battle's Journey to Alvin Ailey (Paula Wiseman Books, 2015)
 Freedom's School (Paula Wiseman Books, 2015)
 Just a Lucky So and So: The Story of Louis Armstrong (Holiday House, 2016)
 Before She Was Harriet (Holiday House, 2017)
 Germs: Sickness, Bad Breath, and Pizza (Henry Holt, 2017)
 Game Changers: The Story of Venus and Serena Williams (Paula Wiseman Books, 2018)
 illustrated by G. Brian Karas
 Whale Trails, Before and Now, illustrated by G. Brian Karas (Henry Holt, 2015)
 illustrated by Raul Colon
 Counting the Stars: The Story of Katherine Johnson, NASA Mathematician (Paula Wiseman Books, 2019)

Awards 
Nominated

 2018 NAACP Image Award in Outstanding Literary Work - Children's category for Before She Was Harriet

Won

 2018 Jane Addams Children's Book Award for Younger Children Honor for Before She Was Harriet
 2019 Coretta Scott King Book Award Author Honor for Finding Langston
 2019 Charlotte Zolotow Award for Highly Commended Title for Before She Was Harriet
2021 Mathical Honors for Counting the Stars: The Story of Katherine Johnson, NASA Mathematician.

References 

Living people
Year of birth missing (living people)
21st-century American women writers
21st-century African-American writers
Pratt Institute alumni
People from Malden, Massachusetts
21st-century African-American women writers
21st-century American writers
Writers from Massachusetts
American children's writers
American women children's writers